The Georgian Soviet Socialist Republic, also known as Soviet Georgia, the Georgian SSR, or simply Georgia, was one of the republics of the Soviet Union from its second occupation (by Russia) in 1921 to its independence in 1991. Coterminous with the present-day republic of Georgia, it was based on the traditional territory of Georgia, which had existed as a series of independent states in the Caucasus prior to the first occupation of annexation in the course of the 19th century. The Georgian SSR was formed in 1921 and subsequently incorporated in the Soviet Union in 1922. Until 1936 it was a part of the Transcaucasian Socialist Federative Soviet Republic, which existed as a union republic within the USSR. From November 18, 1989, the Georgian SSR declared its sovereignty over Soviet laws. The republic was renamed the Republic of Georgia on November 14, 1990, and subsequently became independent before the dissolution of the Soviet Union on April 9, 1991, whereupon each former SSR became a sovereign state.

Geographically, the Georgian SSR was bordered by Turkey to the south-west and the Black Sea to the west. Within the Soviet Union it bordered the Russian SFSR to the north, the Armenian SSR to the south and the Azerbaijan SSR to the south-east.

History

Establishment
On November 28, 1917, after the October Revolution in Russia, there was a Transcaucasian Commissariat established in Tiflis. On April 22 the Transcaucasian Democratic Federative Republic was formed, though it only lasted for a month before being replaced by three new states: 
the Georgian Democratic Republic, the First Republic of Armenia and the Azerbaijan Democratic Republic. The 1919 parliamentary elections saw the Social Democratic Party come to power in Georgia. It tried to establish a moderate left, multi-party system, but faced some internal and external problems. Georgia was dragged into wars against Armenia and remnants of the Ottoman Empire, while the rapid spread of ideas of revolutionary socialism in rural regions accounted for some Soviet-backed peasants' revolts in Racha, Samegrelo and Dusheti. In 1921, the crisis came to a head. 11th Red Army invaded Georgia from south and headed to Tbilisi. On 25 February, after a one-week offence by the Red Army, Tbilisi fell to the Bolsheviks. Georgian Bolsheviks took over the country and proclaimed the establishment of the Georgian SSR. Some small-scale battles between Bolshevik troops and Georgian Army also took place in Western Georgia. In March 1921 the government of the Georgian Democratic Republic was forced in exile. On March 2 of the following year the first constitution of Soviet Georgia was accepted.

On 13 October 1921 the Treaty of Kars was signed, which established the common borders between Turkey and the three Transcaucasian republics of the Soviet Union. Georgian SSR was forced to cede Georgian-dominated Artvin Okrug to Turkey in exchange for Adjara, which was granted political autonomy within Georgian SSR under Soviet rule.

Transcaucasian Soviet Federated Socialist Republics

In 1922 the Georgian SSR was incorporated into Soviet Union. From March 12, 1922, to December 5, 1936, it was part of the Transcaucasian SFSR together with the Armenian SSR and the Azerbaijan SSR. During this period the province was led by Lavrentiy Beria, the first secretary of the Georgian Central Committee of the Communist Party of Georgia.
In 1936, the TSFSR was dissolved and Georgia became the Georgian Soviet Socialist Republic.

Lavrentiy Beria became head of the Georgian branch of the Joint State Political Directorate (OGPU) and was transferred to Moscow in 1938.

Purges

The exact number of Georgians executed during the Great Purges is not estimated, but some scholars suggest it varies from 30,000 to 60,000. During the purges, many eminent Georgian intellectuals such as Mikheil Javakhishvili, Evgeni Mikeladze, Vakhtang Kotetishvili, Paolo Iashvili, Titsian Tabidze and Dimitri Shevardnadze were executed or sent to the Gulag. Party officials also suffered the purges. Many prominent Georgian Bolsheviks, such as Mikheil Kakhiani, Mamia Orakhelashvili, Sergo Ordzhonikidze, Budu Mdivani, Mikheil Okujava and Samson Mamulia were removed from office and killed.

World War II

Reaching the Caucasus oilfields was one of the main objectives of Adolf Hitler's invasion of the USSR in June 1941, but the armies of the Axis powers never reached as far as Georgia. The country contributed almost 700,000 fighters (350,000 were killed) to the Red Army, and was a vital source of textiles and munitions.  During this period Joseph Stalin (an ethnic Georgian) ordered the deportation of the Chechen, Ingush, Karachay and the Balkarian peoples from the Northern Caucasus; they were transported to Siberia and Central Asia for alleged collaboration with the Nazis. He abolished their respective autonomous republics.  The Georgian SSR was briefly granted some of their territory until 1957.

Post-Stalin period

On March 9, 1956, about a hundred Georgian students were killed when they demonstrated against Nikita Khrushchev's policy of de-Stalinization that was accompanied by an offhanded remark he made about Georgians at the end of his anti-Stalin speech.

The decentralisation program introduced by Khrushchev in the mid-1950s was soon exploited by Georgian Communist Party officials to build their own regional power base. A thriving pseudo-capitalist shadow economy emerged alongside the official state-owned economy. While the official growth rate of the economy of the Georgia was among the lowest in the USSR, such indicators as savings level, rates of car and house ownership were the highest in the Union, making Georgia one of the most economically successful Soviet republics.  Corruption was at a high level.  Among all the union republics, Georgia had the highest number of residents with high or special secondary education.

Although corruption was hardly unknown in the Soviet Union, it became so widespread and blatant in Georgia that it came to be an embarrassment to the authorities in Moscow. Eduard Shevardnadze, the country's interior minister between 1964 and 1972, gained a reputation as a fighter of corruption and engineered the removal of Vasil Mzhavanadze, the corrupt First Secretary of the Georgian Communist Party.  Shevardnadze ascended to the post of First Secretary with the blessings of Moscow. He was an effective and able ruler of Georgia from 1972 to 1985, improving the official economy and dismissing hundreds of corrupt officials.

In the 1970s Soviet authorities adopted a new policy of forming a "Soviet people". The "Soviet people" were said to be a "new historical, social, and international community of people having a common territory, economy, and socialist content; a culture that reflected the particularities of multiple nationalities; a federal state; and a common ultimate goal: the construction of communism." The Russian Language was meant to become the common language of this community, considering the role that Russian was playing for the nations and nationalities of the Soviet Union. However, in 1978, Soviet authorities had to face the opposition of thousands of Georgians, who gathered in downtown Tbilisi to hold mass demonstration after Soviet officials accepted removal of the constitutional status of the Georgian language as Georgia's sole official state language. Bowing to pressure from mass street demonstrations on April 14, 1978, Moscow approved Shevardnadze's reinstatement of the constitutional guarantee the same year. April 14 was established as a Day of the Georgian Language. In 1981, massive celebrations took place in honour of the republic's 60th anniversary, with a mass event taking place in front of General Secretary Brezhnev on Tbilisi's Constitution Square.

End of the Soviet period

Shevardnadze's appointment as Soviet Foreign Minister in 1985 brought his replacement in Georgia by Jumber Patiashvili, a conservative and generally ineffective Communist who coped poorly with the challenges of perestroika. Towards the end of the late 1980s, increasingly violent clashes occurred between the Communist authorities, the resurgent Georgian nationalist movement and nationalist movements in Georgia's minority-populated regions (notably South Ossetia). On April 9, 1989, Soviet troops were used to break up a peaceful demonstration at the government building in Tbilisi. Twenty Georgians were killed and hundreds wounded. The event radicalised Georgian politics, prompting many – even some Georgian communists – to conclude that independence was preferable than Soviet unity and would provide Georgia with a chance to fully integrate both South Ossetia and Abkhazia, whose peoples were still loyal to the Union.

On October 28, 1990, democratic parliamentary elections were held. On November 14 a transitional period was declared until the restoration of Georgia's independence and in this regard, the republic changed its name to    "Republic of Georgia". Georgia (excluding Abkhazia) was one of the six republics along with Armenia, Moldova and the Baltic States who boycotted participation in the March 1991 union-wide preservation referendum. On March 31, 1991, a referendum was held on the restoration of Georgia's independence on the basis of the Independence Act of 26 May 1918. The majority of voters voted for.   

Georgia declared independence on April 9, 1991, under Zviad Gamsakhurdia, as one of the republics to secede just four months before the failed coup against Gorbachev in August, which was supported by a declining number of hardliners. However, this was unrecognized by the Soviet government and Georgia was in the Soviet Union until its collapse in December 1991.

Footnotes

Bibliography

External links 
Georgia, land of the Golden Fleece, reveals its riches a propaganda pamphlet about the GSSR from the 1960s.
 Avalishvili, Levan: "The “Great Terror” of 1937–1938 in Georgia: Between the Two Reports of Lavrentiy Beria" in the Caucasus Analytical Digest No. 22
 Anchabadze, George: "Mass Terror in the USSR: The Story of One Family" in the Caucasus Analytical Digest No. 22
საქართველოს ეროვნული მუზეუმი Georgian museum of Soviet Occupation, Tbilisi.

 

Former socialist republics
20th century in Georgia (country)
Post–Russian Empire states
Republics of the Soviet Union
1920s in Georgia (country)
1930s in Georgia (country)

1990s in Georgia (country)
States and territories established in 1921
States and territories disestablished in 1991
1921 establishments in Georgia (country)
1991 disestablishments in Georgia (country)
1991 disestablishments in the Soviet Union